Tveita is a subway station on the Furuset Line of the Oslo Metro between Hellerud and Haugerud, located in the Alna borough of Oslo, Norway. The station is the first one on Furusetbanen that is not shared with another line. It was opened as part of the original line in 1970. Tveita is located underneath the shopping centre Tveita senter.

The neighborhood of Tveita is a dense residential area with several large apartment buildings.

References

External links

Oslo Metro stations in Oslo
Railway stations opened in 1970
1970 establishments in Norway